Yelü Lübugu or known by her title as Princess of Yan State, was a Liao dynasty princess and the first daughter of Emperor Taizong of Liao. She then married Prime Minister Xiao Siwen and bore him the three Xiao Sisters (Xiao Hunian, Lady Xiao and Xiao Yanyan). However, she died from her illness. Her youngest daughter Xiao Yanyan married with Yelü Xian and in 969 and become the Liao empress. The Xiao family was the queen faction of the Liao dynasty, all future empress and brides for royalty originate from this faction.

Family
Husband: Xiao Siwen
Daughter: Xiao Hunian (953 - 1009) (萧胡辇)
Son In-law: Yelü Yanchege (935 - 972) (耶律罨撒葛)
Daughter: Lady Xiao (萧氏)
Son In-law: Yelü Xiyin (耶律喜隱)
Daughter: Xiao Yanyan (953 - 1009) (蕭燕燕) – also known as Xiao Chuo (蕭綽)
Son In-law: Emperor Jingzong of Liao (1 September 948 - 13 October 982) (遼景宗) – had 4 sons and 3 daughters.
Adopted son: Xiao Jixian (萧继先) – Actually was Xiao Siwen's nephew.

References

Year of birth unknown
Liao dynasty people
10th-century Khitan women
Yelü clan